Acrostictomyia longistigma is a species of ulidiidae or picture-winged fly in the genus Acrostictomyia of the family Ulidiidae.

References

Ulidiidae
Insects described in 1938